William Morrell may refer to:
William Morrell (poet) (fl. 1625), British Anglican clergyman and early American poet
William John Morrell (1868–1945), chancellor of Otago University, Dunedin, New Zealand
William Morrell (historian) (1899–1986), New Zealand historian and professor

See also
Bill Morrell (Willard Blackmer Morrell), American baseball player